Amor De Cosmos (born William Alexander Smith; August 20, 1825 – July 4, 1897) was a Canadian journalist, publisher and politician.  He served as the second premier of British Columbia.

Early life
Amor De Cosmos was born William Alexander Smith in Windsor, Nova Scotia, to United Empire Loyalist parents. His education included a stint at King's College in Windsor, following which, around 1840, he became a mercantile clerk in Halifax, Nova Scotia. There he joined the Dalhousie University debating club and came under the influence of the Nova Scotia politician and reformer, Joseph Howe. In 1845, at the age of 20 he joined the Church of Jesus Christ of Latter-day Saints. In 1852, he left for New York on a steam ship stopping first in Boston. He settled in Kanesville, known as Council Bluffs, Iowa, for two months where he established a daguerreotype gallery. But the following year the lure of the California Gold Rush beckoned, and Smith continued west, heading overland to Placerville, California. Here he set up a new studio and prospered taking pictures of the miners and their operations. Joined by his brother, the pair moved northwest to Oroville, California, where they engaged in various unspecified entrepreneurial ventures. In 1854, Smith successfully petitioned the California State Assembly to have his name changed to "Amor De Cosmos", a fancifully loose translation (using Latin and Greek roots) of "Lover of the Universe", although in Portuguese and Spanish, it literally means Love of Cosmos.
The name paid tribute, De Cosmos said, "to what I love most ... Love of order, beauty, the world, the universe."

Reformer and journalist
In 1858, De Cosmos and his brother moved on again, this time heading north to British North America as they wished to live under the British flag once again. They also sensed an opportunity in the booming city of  Victoria, capital of the Colony of Vancouver Island. The city, since 1843 a quiet village of about 300 until the spring of that year, was just entering an economic boom as it became a jumping-off point for miners headed to the New Caledonia (now mainland British Columbia) to participate in the Fraser Canyon Gold Rush. De Cosmos founded a newspaper, The Daily British Colonist, which survives today in its current incarnation as the Victoria Times-Colonist.  

De Cosmos was the editor of the Colonist through 1863, and quickly established himself as an opponent of the administration of Sir James Douglas, governor of the colony and the former Chief Factor of the Hudson's Bay Company for Vancouver Island. De Cosmos decried the "family-company compact" of Hudson's Bay men and Douglas associates who controlled the political and social affairs of the colony, even after Douglas's retirement in 1864.

De Cosmos was a liberal reformer cast in the mold of John Locke and John Stuart Mill. He argued passionately for unrestricted free enterprise, public education, an end to economic and political privileges, and — above all — the institution of responsible government through an elected assembly. However, true to the Victorian spirit of the age, De Cosmos was also a proponent of social progress through economic and population growth. He was a tireless advocate for economic diversification, being one of the first British Columbians to argue for a policy of encouraging development of the "three F's" — farming, forestry, and fisheries — that would underpin the region's economy for the next century.

Political career

As the child of American refugees and having lived six years in the United States, De Cosmos developed a sharpened sense of nationalism. This was expressed in a growing protectionist economic sentiment, and the belief that the colonies of British North America needed to be self-supporting, develop a distinct identity, and form a political and economic union. From such policies, emerged the two great causes of his later career: the union of Vancouver Island and British Columbia, and the merged Colony of British Columbia's entry into Confederation. To advance the first cause, De Cosmos left journalism and entered politics, becoming a member of the Legislative Assembly of Vancouver Island from 1863 until its union with the Colony of British Columbia in 1866. He advanced the second cause through his position as a member of the assembly of the merged, larger British Columbia from 1867–68 and 1870–71, and as the leading force (with Robert Beaven and John Robson) behind the colony's Confederation League. Through the instrumental role De Cosmos played in realizing these two goals, he earned for himself his reputation as British Columbia's Father of Confederation.

At the time of British Columbia's entry into Confederation on July 20, 1871, De Cosmos was the leading pro-Confederation figure in the new province.  That year, he was elected to represent Victoria in both the provincial legislature and the House of Commons. Despite his prominence — or perhaps because of it — Lieutenant Governor Sir Joseph Trutch passed over De Cosmos for the job of Premier, instead asking John Foster McCreight to assume the position.

Iconoclastic reputation

Undoubtedly, De Cosmos' reputation as an iconoclast and his infamously volatile temperament did not endear him to the establishment .

Premier of British Columbia

McCreight resigned in 1872 on a motion of non-confidence, and on December 23, 1872, Trutch asked De Cosmos to form a new government as Premier. De Cosmos populated his cabinet with reformers, mostly born in North America, many of whom would come to dominate provincial politics for the generation. His government pursued an agenda of political reform, economic expansion, and the development of public institutions—especially schools.

De Cosmos was a member of a group of entrepreneurs that saw an opportunity for a steel industry in B.C. using the newly discovered iron deposits on Texada Island, coal from Vancouver Island with a smelter and rolling mill in Vancouver. Rails for the transcontinental railway proposed western construction starting in Vancouver to meet the push from the east would provide the immediate market for the product. Involving himself in this venture in his position as Premier was considered a conflict of interest and precipitated the Texada Scandal and the second B.C. Royal Commission of Inquiry. He resigned as Premier. The Commission however found him not guilty.

Member of Parliament

Despite having resigned as Premier, De Cosmos continued to be re-elected as a Liberal Member of Parliament for Victoria City. Consistent with federal promises to place the terminus of the transcontinental railway in Victoria, De Cosmos, in Ottawa, pushed for completion, especially of the Vancouver Island portion. De Cosmos also became an opponent of land concessions to First Nations in the province, seeing it as a hindrance to British Columbia's economic growth and settlement by those of European descent. It is generally conceded that De Cosmos's tenure as a member of the dominion parliament was undistinguished .

Retirement and death
De Cosmos lost the 1882 federal election and retired to Victoria. Although widely regarded as a stirring orator, a master debater, and a man of great intellectual depth, De Cosmos had always been considered eccentric. Contemporaries paint a portrait of an isolated person (he never married and had few intimate friends; some claimed he had a daughter from a friend he met) with grandiose manners, prone to public outbursts of tears, and a fierce temper that sometimes degenerated into fist-fights. He had unusual phobias — including a fear of electricity. As he grew older, his eccentricities intensified; he became increasingly incoherent.

Declared insane

By 1895 he was declared insane. One of his more notable eccentricities was the founding of a hot food delivery company to prospectors in the Klondike Gold Fields. The difficult logistics of this service scared away investors and ultimately proved its downfall. He died on July 4, 1897 in Victoria at the age of 71.

References

External links 

 
 Biography at Library and Archives Canada
 The British Colonist newspaper on-line archive
 Amor de Cosmos in Kalama, Wash., 1873

1825 births
1897 deaths
Fathers of Confederation
Liberal Party of Canada MPs
Members of the House of Commons of Canada from British Columbia
Colony of Nova Scotia people
Premiers of British Columbia
Canadian Latter Day Saints
People from Windsor, Nova Scotia
Persons of National Historic Significance (Canada)
Politicians from Victoria, British Columbia
Members of the Legislative Council of British Columbia
Pre-Confederation Canadian expatriates in the United States